The Tasek Gelugor railway station is a Malaysian train station located at and named after the town of Tasek Gelugor, Penang.

References

External links
 Tasek Gelugor Railway Station

KTM ETS railway stations
Railway stations in Penang